Hinton Priory was a Carthusian monastery in northeast Somerset, England, from 1232 until 1539.

History 
The priory was one of the ten medieval Carthusian houses (charterhouses) in England. It was first established at Hatherop, Gloucestershire in 1222 by William Longspee, Earl of Salisbury. The monks disliked the location, and on Longspee's death in 1226 they petitioned his countess for a new site to achieve greater solitude. It was called Locus Dei meaning 'God's Place'.

This ceased to be used, probably in the 14th century, and the lay brothers were accommodated with the main community.

Hinton gained the land and property of the small Longleat Priory in 1529.

The house was suppressed as part of the dissolution of the monasteries on 31 March 1539; at that time it housed the Prior, sixteen monks and six lay brothers. The property was then bought by Matthew Colthurst.

Today 
The chapter house, with library and dovecote above, survives and was designated as Grade I listed in 1956. Also standing is the refectory (also Grade I) which is part of a former stable yard (Grade II) incorporating other early work. All now belong to the sixteenth century country house, also known as Hinton Priory, on the northern part of the site and itself a Grade I listed building. Surviving earthworks from the great cloister are visible in an orchard and paddocks.

The site is a Scheduled Ancient Monument. It is included in the Heritage at Risk Register produced by English Heritage; the entry for 2012 states that its condition is "Poor" and that some parts are in need of condition assessment.

The Priory is in private ownership and there is no public access.

The site of the lower house on the River Frome is also a scheduled monument. A small current settlement there preserves the name of its predecessor in its name of "Friary".  Earthworks and buried material remain, and a later cottage incorporates fragments of 14th century masonry; an interpretation board was erected by the Cotswolds Conservation Board in 2017 and indicates the layout of the mediaeval buildings.

References

Further reading 
 Glyn Coppack and Mick Aston: Christ's Poor Men — the Carthusians in England 

Archaeological sites in Somerset
Carthusian monasteries in England
Christian monasteries established in the 13th century
Monasteries dissolved under the English Reformation
Grade I listed buildings in Bath and North East Somerset
Grade I listed monasteries
Monasteries in Somerset
Ruined abbeys and monasteries
Ruins in Somerset
Scheduled monuments in Bath and North East Somerset
Structures on the Heritage at Risk register in Somerset
1222 establishments in England
1539 disestablishments in England